Alexandre Lyssov ( born March 10, 1994)  is a Canadian Épée fencer. At the Inaugural 2010 Youth Olympics in Singapore he became first ever Canadian fencer to step onto the Olympic podium and also the only fencer from Canada who won two Olympic branded Medals

Fencing Career Highlights

Training History
Alexandre started going for sports at age of eight and completely switched to fencing at age of eleven. Initially he received instructions in foil and practised at community oriented clubs, but looking to gain a new level, he later switched to épée and continued his training under well known fencing masters.

References

External links
 Personal Website

1994 births
Living people
Canadian male fencers
Fencers at the 2010 Summer Youth Olympics
Youth Olympic bronze medalists for Canada